Events from the year 1925 in Scotland.

Incumbents 

 Secretary for Scotland and Keeper of the Great Seal – Sir John Gilmour, Bt

Law officers 
 Lord Advocate – William Watson
 Solicitor General for Scotland – David Fleming until December; then Alexander Munro MacRobert

Judiciary 
 Lord President of the Court of Session and Lord Justice General – Lord Clyde
 Lord Justice Clerk – Lord Alness
 Chairman of the Scottish Land Court – Lord St Vigeans

Events 
 18 April – the dam of Skelmorlie reservoir bursts, flooding the village and killing 5.
 21 March – Murrayfield Stadium in Edinburgh, home of the Scottish Rugby Union, opens with Scotland defeating England 14-11.
 16 May – the war memorial on the Law, Dundee, is inaugurated.
 7 July – the original Kelvin Hall in Glasgow is destroyed by fire.
 7 August – National Library of Scotland established by Act of Parliament to take over the national responsibilities of the Advocates' Library in Edinburgh.
 2 October – John Logie Baird successfully transmits the first television pictures with a greyscale image, in London.
 29 December – Alexander Munro MacRobert appointed Solicitor General for Scotland, replacing David Fleming
 The uninhabited Shiant Isles are acquired by writer and island-lover Compton Mackenzie.

Births 
 28 January – Michael Scott Weir, diplomat, Arabist (died 2006)
 1 February – Bobby Laing, professional footballer (died 1985)
 15 February – Eric Brown, professional golfer (died 1986)
 18 February – Russell Hunter, actor (died 2004)
 1 April – Walter Carr, actor (died 1998)
 2 April – George MacDonald Fraser, author, notable for The Flashman Papers (died 2008 in the Isle of Man)
 5 April – John Boyd, milliner, based in London (died 2018)
 6 May – Angus Black, international rugby union player (died 2018)
 29 May – Mick McGahey, Communist miners' leader (died 1999)
 3 June – Thomas Winning, Archbishop of Glasgow and Cardinal (died 2001)
 19 June – Robert Fyfe, actor
 25 July – Duncan Johnstone, bagpiper and composer (died 1999)
 30 July – Alexander Trocchi, novelist (died 1984)
 4 September – John McKenzie, footballer (died 2017)
 13 September – Ian Hamilton, lawyer and nationalist (died 2022)
 28 October – Ian Hamilton Finlay, poet and sculptor (died 2006)
 26 November – Phil McCall, actor (died 2002)
 30 December – Ian MacNaughton, actor and television director/producer (died 2002)
 John Quigley, author

Deaths 
 11 January – John Sinclair, 1st Baron Pentland, Liberal Party MP, soldier, peer and administrator (born 1860)
 14 January – David MacRitchie, folklorist and antiquarian (born 1851)
 25 April – John Quinton Pringle, painter (born 1864)
 July – James Seth, philosopher (born 1860)
 25 October – Henry J. Watt, experimental psychologist (born 1879)

The arts
John Buchan's novel John Macnab is published.
Hugh MacDiarmid's synthetic Scots poetry Sangshaw is published.

See also 
 Timeline of Scottish history
 1925 in Northern Ireland

References 

 
Years of the 20th century in Scotland
Scotland
1920s in Scotland